John McDonagh (14 August 1892 – 14 June 1964) was a South African cricketer. He played in one first-class match for Border in 1913/14.

See also
 List of Border representative cricketers

References

External links
 

1892 births
1964 deaths
South African cricketers
Border cricketers